Polarsets are a four-piece band from Newcastle upon Tyne, England. They have released an album, Parasols, an EP and a number of singles.

Career 
After a winter of writing, Polarsets recorded the "Leave Argentina" single, which was released in 2010 on Bandcamp. Both this track and its B-side "Just Don't Open Your Eyes Yet" were instrumental in the band being able to play live locally. They were selected to open the Main Stage of the Evolution Festival in Newcastle in 2010 and with support slots for Ellie Goulding, Delphic and Field Music amongst others, while they released the song "Morning" on Bandcamp in late 2010.

In April 2011, the band released their second official single "Sunshine Eyes" on Kitsuné Records, also included on the compilation Kitsuné Maison 11. The Jensen Sportag's remix of the track also appeared on Kitsuné's Club Night mix. Sunshine Eyes has enjoyed considerable play on Radio 1, where Zane Lowe made the track his 'Next Hype' in May 2011. Polarsets also played the BBC Introducing stage at the Radio 1 Big Weekend 2011. In June 2011, Polarsets supported Two Door Cinema Club at the Wedgewood Rooms in Portsmouth.

In August 2011, the band released the single "Morning" on 7" Vinyl through Neon Gold Records. Jaymo & Andy George's label Moda handled the digital release of Morning in September 2011. Polarsets performed in various European cities, while in 2012, they performed at South by South West (SXSW) in Austin, Texas. The band released their first EP entitled Exotica in June of that year. 

Over the course of 2014, Carmen Ledda Green joined to band on vocals and keyboards. Their debut album Parasols was released 22 September 2014.

The band's social media accounts have been inactive since 2016, leading many to speculate that they combusted unintentionally around that time.

References

Musical groups established in 2009
Musical groups from Newcastle upon Tyne
Kitsuné artists